Yorktown Central School District is a school district in Yorktown Heights, New York.

It operates the following schools:
Brookside Elementary School - Grades K-3
Mohansic Elementary School - Grades K-3
Crompond Elementary School - Grades 4-5
Mildred E. Strang Middle School - Grades 6-8
Yorktown High School

History
Ralph Napolitano became superintendent circa 2006. Napolitano was criticized for abruptly firing the principal of Yorktown High School in February 2008. He retired in 2017.

In 2016 the district had 3,400 students. The district was named "School District of Character" in 2016.

Ronald Hattar became the superintendent in 2017.

References

External links
 Official site.

School districts in New York (state)
Yorktown, New York
Education in Westchester County, New York